Kritsana Klanklin (born 26 February 1984) is a Thai professional footballer who plays for Kasetsart in Thai League 2.

He played for Krung Thai Bank in the 2008 AFC Champions League group stages.

Honours

Club
Bangkok Glass
 Singapore Cup Winner (1): 2010

References

External links
 Goal.com 
 Players Profile - info.thscore.com
 

1984 births
Living people
Kritsana Klanklin
Kritsana Klanklin
Association football goalkeepers
Kritsana Klanklin
Kritsana Klanklin
Kritsana Klanklin
Kritsana Klanklin
Kritsana Klanklin